The Clean Energy Project (CEP) was a virtual high-throughput discovery and design effort for the next generation of plastic solar cell materials that has finished. It studies millions of candidate structures to identify suitable compounds for the harvesting of renewable energy from the sun and for other organic electronic applications. It ran on the BOINC platform.

Project purpose
The project searched for the most suitable organic compounds with which to make solar cells, the best polymeric membranes with which to make fuel cells, and how best to assemble the molecules for such devices.

Current project status
On June 24, 2013, the Clean Energy Project released its database to the public and the research community.  The release was featured on the White House Blog and by several news organizations including the MIT Technology Review. The database contains 150 million density functional theory calculations on 2.3 million molecules.

Publications 
 C. Amador-Bedolla, R. Olivares-Amaya, J. Hachmann, A. Aspuru-Guzik, Towards Materials Informatics for Organic Photovoltaics, in Informatics for Materials Science and Engineering, K. Rajan, Ed., Elsevier, Amsterdam (2013). In press.
 R. Olivares-Amaya, C. Amador-Bedolla, J. Hachmann, S. Atahan-Evrenk, R.S. Sánchez-Carrera, L. Vogt, A. Aspuru-Guzik, Accelerated Computational Discovery of High-performance Materials for Organic Photovoltaics by Means of Cheminformatics. Energy & Environmental Science 4 (2011), 4849–4861. 
 
 A.N. Sokolov, S. Atahan-Evrenk, R. Mondal, H.B. Akkerman, R.S. Sánchez-Carrera, S. Granados-Focil, J. Schrier, S.C.B. Mannsfeld, A.P. Zoombelt, Z. Bao, A. Aspuru-Guzik, From Computational Discovery to Experimental Characterization of a High Hole Mobility Organic Crystal. Nature Communications 2 (2011), 437.

See also
 BOINC
 List of volunteer computing projects
 World Community Grid

References

External links
Clean Energy Project at the World Community Grid
Clean Energy Project Website 
Clean Energy Project Database

Berkeley Open Infrastructure for Network Computing projects
Science in society
Free science software